Bria Airport  is an airport serving Bria, a town on the Kotto River in the Haute-Kotto prefecture of the Central African Republic. The airport is in the southern section of the town.

The Bria VOR (Ident: IA) is located on the field.

See also

Transport in the Central African Republic
List of airports in the Central African Republic

References

External links 
OpenStreetMap - Bria
OurAirports - Bria Airport

Airports in the Central African Republic
Buildings and structures in Haute-Kotto